Xinbin may refer to:

Xinbin Manchu Autonomous County, in Liaoning, China
Xinbin Town, county seat of Xinbin County, Liaoning, China